Arturo Mas (15 October 1901 – 18 December 1979) was a sailor from Spain, who represented his country at the 1924 Summer Olympics in Le Havre, France.

References

Sources
 

1901 births
1979 deaths
Olympic sailors of Spain
Real Club Marítimo de Barcelona sailors
Sailors at the 1924 Summer Olympics – 6 Metre
Spanish male sailors (sport)